Men's ice hockey tournaments have been staged at the Olympic Games since 1920. The men's tournament was introduced at the 1920 Summer Olympics, and permanently added to the Winter Olympic Games in 1924. Yugoslavia participated in five tournaments, from 1964 until 1976, and again in 1984, when they hosted the games in Sarajevo. A total of 6 goaltenders and 53 skaters participated from Yugoslavia. 

Albin Felc scored the  most goals, 17, and points, 23, while Gorazd Hiti had the most assists, 8. Nine skaters and one goaltender played in three separate Olympics, while four players each played in 19 games, the most for Yugoslavia at the Olympics.

Key

Goaltenders

Skaters

Notes

References
 
 
 

Yugoslavia
Yugoslavia